Bettadasanapura  is a village in the southern state of Karnataka, India. It is located in the Bengaluru South taluk of Bengaluru Urban District.The name, Bettadasanapura, is derived from three kannada words: betta means "hill", dasa means "servant of god" and pura means "town".

References

External links
 Bangalore Government Website 

Villages in Bangalore Urban district